Charles E. "Red" Ash (December 28, 1915 – March 3, 1991) was an Ohio Republican Party politician and a member of the Ohio General Assembly.  Ash became a well known local as the head basketball coach for Canton South High School for almost forty years.  However, after a knee injury prevented him from coaching, Ash entered politics. By the end of his tenure as coach, he had been the winningest coach in high school basketball history.

Ash decided to run against newly appointed Representative Robert Regula in 1978, and won handily.  He won reelection five times, and retired in 1990.  A year later, he died, at the age of 75.

References

1915 births
Republican Party members of the Ohio House of Representatives
1991 deaths
20th-century American politicians